Impermanent Resonance is the third solo album and fifth solo project by Canadian singer James LaBrie. It was released on July 29, 2013, in Europe and on August 6, 2013, in North America.

The album carries on the melodic death metal style first featured on the album Static Impulse, and once again features screaming vocals by drummer Peter Wildoer.

Impermanent Resonance was released to generally positive reviews and reception from critics and fans.

Release

The cover art and release date were revealed on June 4, 2013. The first single, "Agony", was released on June 19, 2013. The European digipak edition features an alternative artwork. Two limited 180 gr. vinyl editions were also released: a black version and a white version. Both versions include a bonus CD with the full album and the bonus tracks featured on the European digipak edition.

Track list

Reception 

The album generally received very positive reviews and reception. Daniel Køtz of the German webzine CDstarts.de wrote that James LaBrie and his band have found their very own sound at last which is emancipated from Dream Theater. He writes that the album is not a simple alternative to Dream Theater but an original work.

I Will Not Break EP 

I Will Not Break is a digital EP by James LaBrie. It was on January 6, 2014 in Europe and on January 14, 2014 in North America. The EP consists of nine songs. Track 1 is from Impermanent Resonance and track 2 and track 3 are from the European digipak edition of that album. Track 4 is an alternate mix of "Coming Home" from Static Impulse and track 5 and track 6 are demos of two songs from that album. Track 7, 8 and 9 are electronica remixes of songs from Static Impulse. Track 7 was previously available in Japan and the last two tracks have never been released before.

Personnel

Band 
 James LaBrie - lead vocals (except on demos)
 Marco Sfogli - guitar
 Matt Guillory - keyboards, background vocals, lead vocals on demos, editing
 Ray Riendeau - bass, bass recording
 Peter Wildoer - drums, screaming vocals

Production 
 Jens Bogren - mixing
 Tony Lindgren - mastering
 Peter Wichers - guitar recording, editing, composing
Johan Örnborg - drum recording
 Shane McCurdy - vocal recording

Photography 
Danny Morrison - James
Aaron Aslanian - Ray
Pina Benevento - Marco
Bihter Guillory - Matt
Andreas Ejnarsson - Wildoer
Leticia Dumas - cover art, photos
 Gustavo Sazes - artwork photos, artwork and sleeve design

References 

2013 albums
James LaBrie albums
Inside Out Music albums